Op Flohr Stadion is a multi-use stadium in Grevenmacher, Luxembourg.

It is currently used mostly for football matches and is the home stadium of CS Grevenmacher. The stadium holds 4,062 people.

Gallery

References

External links
World Stadiums - Op Flohr
StadiumDB profile

Football venues in Luxembourg
Grevenmacher